East Nassau Central School is a historic school building located at East Nassau in Rensselaer County, New York.  It was built in 1930 and is a two-story, steel frame and concrete block building with a brick veneer in the Classical Revival style.  It sits upon a raised concrete foundation and has a flat roof concealed behind a low parapet wall with concrete capstones.  It features a small entrance portico of brick with concrete trim and a wrought iron balustrade.

It was listed on the National Register of Historic Places in 1997.

References

School buildings on the National Register of Historic Places in New York (state)
Neoclassical architecture in New York (state)
School buildings completed in 1930
Buildings and structures in Rensselaer County, New York
National Register of Historic Places in Rensselaer County, New York
1930 establishments in New York (state)